Cyrtodactylus buchardi is a species of gecko, a lizard in the family Gekkonidae. The species is endemic to Laos.

Geographic range
C. buchardi is found in southern Laos, in Champasak Province.

Etymology
The specific name, buchardi, is in honor of French businessman Michel Buchard for his longtime financial support of herpetology.

Description
C. buchardi has a more slender body than other Cyrtodactylus, a barely visible lateral fold, a slender but short tail, only 12 subdigital lamellae beneath its 4th toe, and 25 rows of tuberculate dorsal scales. It also has no precloacal groove, three series of enlarged precloacal scales, no enlarged femoral scales, no distinctly enlarged subcaudal scales, 13-14 supralabials, a dorsal pattern made of five transversal series of irregular blotches, and a nuchal collar not reaching the posterior margin of the eyes.

Habitat

Reproduction
C. buchardi is oviparous.

References

Cyrtodactylus
Endemic fauna of Laos
Reptiles of Laos
Reptiles described in 2004